The men's 4 × 400 metres relay event at the 2003 Asian Athletics Championships was held in Manila on September 23.

Results

References

2003 Asian Athletics Championships
Relays at the Asian Athletics Championships